The third album released by Jon Kennedy, and the first on which he has performed vocals.

Track listing
"Cut Up" 
"You, You and You" 
"Heavyweight Freight" 
"Sand People" 
"We Milk Life But Dress Smooth" 
"Save The People" 
"Pick Up Sticks" 
"The Beef" 
"Useless Wooden Toys" 
"Lodestar" 
"All A Dream" 
"Never Wed An Old Man" 
"They Made Us Too Many"

In popular culture
An Electro dance band from Cremona, created by Riccardo Terzi e Gilberto Girardi, was named Useless Wooden Toys in homage of the album.

2005 albums
Grand Central Records albums
Jon Kennedy albums